Douglas Mendes Moreira (born 13 June 2004) is a Brazilian footballer who plays as a central defender for Red Bull Bragantino.

Club career
Born in Tocantins, Minas Gerais, Douglas Mendes joined Ponte Preta's youth sides as an under-15. He made his first team debut on 26 November 2021, coming on as a second-half substitute for Gustavo Cipriano in a 3–2 Série B home win over Coritiba.

Douglas Mendes became a starter for Ponte during the 2022 Série B, but moved to Série A side Red Bull Bragantino on 5 August 2022, signing a five-year contract. He made his debut in the top tier on 9 November, starting in a 6–0 away loss against Fortaleza.

Career statistics

Honours

International
Brazil U20
South American U-20 Championship: 2023

References

2004 births
Living people
Sportspeople from Minas Gerais
Brazilian footballers
Association football defenders
Campeonato Brasileiro Série A players
Campeonato Brasileiro Série B players
Associação Atlética Ponte Preta players
Red Bull Bragantino players